The 1909 Oregon Webfoots football team represented the University of Oregon in the 1909 college football season. It was the Webfoots' sixteenth season, they competed as an independent and were led by head coach Robert Forbes in his second year. They finished the season with a record of three wins and two losses (3–2).

Schedule

Schedule sources:

References

Oregon
Oregon Ducks football seasons
Oregon Webfoots football